Eskbank is an unincorporated community in the Rural Municipality of Eyebrow No. 193, Saskatchewan, Canada. It is located on the former Grand Trunk Pacific (Canadian National Railway) Central Butte Subdivision from Moose Jaw to Riverhurst.

History

Today nothing remains of Eskbank, only a historical plaque, placed at the site of the community in 2009. The post office of Eyebrow Hill was established June 1, 1904 in the home of John William Hudson, renamed "Eskbank" on June 1, 1908 after Eskbank, Scotland. The post office closed June 30, 1964. The last remaining buildings were burned by the rural municipality in 1975. The derelict Saskatchewan Wheat Pool grain elevator built in 1924 by McCabe and closed in 1984 was deliberately burned on November 9, 2009.

See also

 List of communities in Saskatchewan

References

Eyebrow No. 193, Saskatchewan
Unincorporated communities in Saskatchewan
Ghost towns in Saskatchewan